Peter James Wicks (born 1 November 1988) is an English television personality who was a cast member on the ITVBe reality series The Only Way Is Essex.

Life and career
Wicks was born on 1 November 1988 in Harlow, Essex. In 2015, Wicks joined the cast of The Only Way Is Essex for its fifteenth series. In 2018, Wicks was a contestant on Celebrity Island with Bear Grylls. In 2019, Wicks appeared on the sixth series of Celebs Go Dating.He later returned to the series the following year during the COVID-19 pandemic to appear on Celebs Go Virtual Dating. Later in 2020, Wicks was a contestant on Celebrity MasterChef. In April 2021, Wicks joined The Celebrity Circle alongside his friend Sam Thompson to play for money for charity by catfishing as Countdown presenter Rachel Riley. They were runners-up of the series. In 2022, Wicks appeared on an episode of Tipping Point: Lucky Stars and appeared on the fourth series of Celebrity SAS: Who Dares Wins. He has also made guest appearances on television series including Joe Lycett's Got Your Back, CelebAbility, Sunday Brunch, Celebrity Juice, and Supermarket Sweep.
He is also appearing in Celebs Go Dating for his third time in 2022.

Filmography

References

1988 births
Living people
People from Harlow
English television personalities
Participants in British reality television series